The 2000 Japan rugby union tour of Europe was a series of matches played in November 2000 in France and Ireland by Japan national rugby union team.

Results 
'Scores and results list Japan's points tally first.

Japan
tour
Japan national rugby union team tours
tour
tour
Rugby union tours of Ireland
Rugby union tours of France